Lambs Anger is the third studio album by Mr. Oizo. It was released by Ed Banger Records in France on November 17, 2008. It includes "Steroids", which features guest vocalist Uffie. The album cover references the scene from Un Chien Andalou.

Critical reception
At Metacritic, which assigns a weighted average score out of 100 to reviews from mainstream critics, the album received an average score of 68% based on 10 reviews, indicating "generally favorable reviews".

Ian Roullier of MusicOMH gave the album 4 stars out of 5, calling it "a hyperactive but genuinely exciting listen."

Track listing
All songs written, composed and produced by Quentin Dupieux except "Steroids" written by Uffie and Feadz.

Charts

References

External links
 

2008 albums
Mr. Oizo albums
Ed Banger Records albums